Scotland: A New History is a book by Michael Lynch first published by Century Limited in 1990. Pimlico (20 Vauxhall Road, London SW1V 2SA) published a revised edition in 1992 and reprinted this later edition in 1992 and 1993.

.

1990 non-fiction books
20th-century history books
History books about Scotland